State Route 250 (SR 250) is a secondary state highway in Middle Tennessee.

Route description

SR 250 runs from just north of White Bluff on SR 47 in eastern Dickson County to SR 49 just west of Ashland City in Cheatham County.  It runs through the rural communities of Claylick, Petway, and Griffintown, and through the Cheatham State Wildlife Management Area. Between White Bluff and Claylick, it is locally known as Claylick Road, and between Claylick and Petway as Petway Road. Between Claylick and Petway, it crosses a bridge over the Harpeth River.

Major intersections

References

250